Breweries in Maine produce a wide range of beers in different styles that are marketed locally, regionally, and nationally. Brewing companies vary widely in the volume and variety of beer produced, from small nanobreweries to microbreweries to massive multinational conglomerate macrobreweries.

In 2012, Maine's 43 brewing establishments (including breweries, brewpubs, importers, and company-owned packagers and wholesalers) employed 390 people directly, and more than 5,000 others in related jobs such as wholesaling and retailing. Altogether 47 people in Maine had active brewer permits in 2012. Including people directly employed in brewing, as well as those who supply Maine's breweries with everything from ingredients to machinery, the total business and personal tax revenue generated by Maine's breweries and related industries was more than $142 million. Consumer purchases of Maine's brewery products generated more than $49 million in additional tax revenue. In 2016, according to the Brewers Association, Maine ranked 5th in the number of craft breweries per capita (7.6 Breweries per capita) with 77 breweries.

For context, at the end of 2016, there were 5,301 breweries in the United States, including 5,234 craft breweries subdivided into 1,916 brewpubs, 3,132 microbreweries and 186 regional craft breweries.  In that same year, according to the Beer Institute, the brewing industry employed around 65,000 Americans in brewing and distribution and had a combined economic impact of more than $350 billion.

Current breweries
During the past several years the number of craft breweries in Maine has increased.  According to the most recent information from the Brewers Association, which is an advocate for the Craft Brew industry, Maine now has over 90 breweries of various sizes across the state.
2 Feet Brewing Company - Bangor - Opened in 2016
Airline Brewing Company (formerly Square Tail Brewing Company) - Amherst and Ellsworth - Opened in 2015
Allagash Brewing Company - Portland - Opened in 1995
Ambition Brewing - Wilton - Opened in 2019
Austin Street Brewery - Portland - Opened in 2014
The Bag and Kettle - Carrabassett Valley - Opened in 1969
Banded Brewing Co. (formerly Banded Horn Brewing) - Biddeford and Portland- Opened in 2013 (Portland opened in 2020)
Bangor Beer Company - Bangor - Opened in 2017
Barreled Souls Brewing Company - Saco - Opened in 2014
Bateau Brewing - Gardiner - Opened in 2019
Bath Ale Works - Wiscasset - Opened in 2021
Bath Brewing Co. - Bath - Opened in 2018
Batson River Brewing & Distilling - Biddeford, Kennebunk, Portland, and  Wells - Opened in 2018
Battery Steele Brewing - Portland - Opened in 2017
Baxter Brewing Company - Lewiston - Opened in 2010
Bear Bones Beer - Lewiston - Opened in 2016
Bigelow Brewing - Skowhegan - Opened in 2014
Birchwood - Gray - Opened in 2018
Bissell Brothers Brewing Co. - Portland - Opened in 2013
Black Bear Microbrewery - Orono - Opened in 2008
Black Pug Brewing - Brunswick - Opened in 2018
Blank Canvas Brewery - Brewer - Opened in 2015
Blaze Brewing Co. - Camden and Biddeford - Opened in 2018
Boothbay Craft Brewery - Boothbay - Opened in 2009
Bray's Brewing Company - Naples - Opened in 2011
Brewery Extrava - Portland - Opened in 2019
Brickyard Hollow Brewing Co. - Yarmouth - Opened in 2018
Bunker Brewing Company - Portland - Opened in 2011
Corner Point Brewing Co. - Berwick - Opened in 2018
Cushnoc Brewing Co. - Augusta - Opened in 2017
D. L. Geary Brewing Company - Portland - Opened in 1986
DeepWater Brewing Co. - Blue Hill - Opened in 2012
Definitive Brewing Company - Portland - Opened in 2018
First Mile Brewing Co. - Fort Kent - Opened in 2017
Fluvial Brewing - Harrison - Opened in 2019
Fogtown Brewing Co. - Ellsworth - Opened in 2017
Footbridge - Boothbay Harbor - Opened in 2019
Fore River Brewing Company - South Portland - Opened in 2016
Foulmouthed Brewing Company - South Portland - Opened in 2016
Foundation Brewing - Portland - Opened in 2014
Friars' Brewhouse - Bangor - Opened in 2013
Frosty Bottom Brewing - Belfast (no tasting room) - Opened in 2019 
Funky Bow Brewery and Beer Company - Lyman - Opened in 2013
Geaghan Brothers Brewing Co. - Bangor - Opened in 2011
GFB Scottish Pub - Old Orchard Beach - Opened in 2013
Gneiss Brewing Company - Limerick - Opened in 2013
Goodfire Brewing Co. - Portland - Opened in 2017
Grateful Grain Brewing Company - Monmouth - Opened in 2017
Gritty McDuff's - Freeport, Auburn and Portland - Opened in 1988
Island Dog Brewing - South Portland - Opened in 2017
Jack Russell's Steakhouse and Maine Coast Brewery - Bar Harbor - Opened in 1997
Kennebec River Brewery - The Forks - Opened in 1996
Lake St. George Brewing - Liberty - Opened in 2017
The Liberal Cup Public House and Brewery - Hallowell - Opened in 2000
Liberator Brewing Company - Rockland - Opened in 2018
Liberty Craft Brewing - Liberty - Opened in 2014
Liquid Riot Bottling Company (formerly In'finiti Fermentation and Distilllation) - Portland - Opened in 2013 
Lone Pine Brewing Company - Portland - Opened in 2016
Lost Valley Brewing Co. - Auburn - Opened in 2017
Lubec Brewing Company - Lubec - Opened in 2015
Machias River Brewing Co. - Machias - Opened in 2017
Maine Beer Company - Freeport - Opened in 2009
Mainely Brews - Waterville - Opened 2003
Marsh Island Brewing - Orono - Opened in 2015
Mason's Brewing Co. - Brewer - Opened in 2016
Mast Landing Brewing Company - Westbrook - Opened in 2016
Moderation Brewing - Brunswick - Opened in 2018
Monhegan Brewing Company - Monhegan - Opened in 2013
Nonesuch River Brewing Company - Scarborough - Opened in 2017
North Haven Brewing - North Haven - Opened in 2017
Northern Maine Brewing Co. - Caribou - Opened in 2016
Norway Brewing Company - Norway - Opened in 2016
NU Brewery - New Gloucester - Opened in 2019 
Odd Alewives Brewery] - Waldoboro - Opened in 2018
Olive Pit Brewing Co. - Lisbon Opened in 2022
Orono Brewing Company - Orono and Bangor - Opened in 2014
Outland Farm Brewery - Pittsfield - Opened in 2019
Oxbow Brewing - Newcastle and Portland - Opened in 2011
Peak Organic Brewing Co. - Portland - Opened in 2007
The Pour Farm - Union - Opened in 2018
Rising Tide Brewing Company - Portland - Opened in 2010
Saco River Brewing - Fryeburg - Opened in 2016
Sasanoa Brewery - Westport Island - Opened in 2018
Sea Dog Brewing Company - Bangor,  Camden,  South Portland and Topsham - Opened in 1993
Sebago Brewing Co.
Side By Each Brewing Co. - Auburn - Opened in 2019
Stars and Stripes - Freeport - Opened in 2018
Strong Brewing Co. - Sedgwick - Opened in 2013
Sunday River Brewing Co. - Bethel - Opened in 1992
Theory Brewing Company - Wells - Opened in 2015
Threshers Brewing Co. - Searsmont - Opened in 2016
Tributary Brewing Co. - Kittery - Opened in 2014
Tumbledown Brewing Co. - Farmington - Opened in 2014
Turning Page Farm - Monson - Opened in 2018
Urban Farm Fermentory - Portland - Opened in 2010
Waterville Brewing Co. - Waterville - Opened in 2018
Woodland Farms Brewery - Kittery - Opened in 2017
YES Brewing - Westbrook - Opened in 2017
York Beach Beer Company - York – opened in 2019

Future breweries
Ship City Brewpub - Bath - In Planning Stage
Olive Pit Brewing Co. - Lisbon - Coming Fall 2021 on

Former breweries
207 Beer Company - Brewer - Opened in 2018 Closed in 2019
Andy's Brew Pub - Lincolnville - Opened in 2014, closed in 2017
Bar Harbor Brewing - Bar Harbor - Opened in 1990, acquired by Atlantic Brewing Company in 2008
Boon Island Ale House - Wells - Opened in 2003, closed in 2016
Bull Jagger Brewing Company - Portland - Opened in 2011, Closed in 2013
Casco Bay Brewing Co. - Portland - Opened in 1994, brand acquired by Shipyard Brewing Company in 2008
Dirigo Brewing Company - Biddeford - Opened in 2016, closed in 2019
Two Gramps Brewing - Gardiner - Opened in 2017, closed in 2019
Infidel Brewing - Warren - Opened in 2013, closed in 2013
Katahdin Brewing Company - Durham - Opened in 2012, closed in 2017
One Eye Open Brewing Company - Portland - Opened in 2016, closed in 2018
Rocky Coast Brewing - Ogunquit - Opened in 2012, closed in 2016

See also 
Beer in the United States
List of breweries in the United States
List of microbreweries

References

External links
Maine Beer Tasting Rooms website

Maine
Breweries